Below is a list of museums in Poznań, Poland.

The list

National Museum in Poznań and its branches:
Museum of Applied Arts
Museum of the History of Poznań
Military Museum of Wielkopolska
Museum of Musical Instruments
Ethnography Museum

Wielkopolska Museum of the Fight for Independence and its branches:
"Poznań" Army Museum
Fort VII Museum of the Wielkopolska Martyrs
Museum of the Greater Poland Uprising of 1918-1919
Museum of Armaments
June 1956 Poznań Uprising Museum
Shelter of the Mayor of Poznań
Branches of the Raczyński Library:
Kazimiera Iłłakowiczówna Flat and Workshop
Henryk Sienkiewicz Literature Museum
Józef Kraszewski Workshop-Museum
Jerzy Pertek Memorial Room
Regional Branch of PKP PLK SA Memorial Room
Feliks Nowowiejski Music Salon-Museum
Museum of Archaeology and its branch:
Archeological Reserve Genius loci
Archdiocesan Museum
Armoured Warfare Museum
Greater Poland Regional Chamber of Chemists Museum of Pharmacy
Forensic Department Museum of Poznań University of Medical Sciences
Museum of Historical Costume in Poznań
Museum of Motorization, Poznań
Museum of Police
Museum of Environmental Knowledge
Museum of the Poznań Bambers
Museum of Unitra
Museum of Earth
Poznan Croissant Museum

References

External links
 Official website of National Museum in Poznań

Poznań
Poznań
Museums